Debbie Jones (born 4 June 1958) is a Bermudian sprinter. She attended Tennessee State University in Nashville, Tennessee.  She competed in the women's 100 metres at the 1976 Summer Olympics. She is the first athlete to win the Carifta Games' Austin Sealy Award for Outstanding Athlete of the Games. She received the award in 1977.

She is married to Anthony Hunter.

References

1958 births
Living people
Athletes (track and field) at the 1976 Summer Olympics
Bermudian female sprinters
Olympic athletes of Bermuda
Place of birth missing (living people)
Athletes (track and field) at the 1974 British Commonwealth Games
Athletes (track and field) at the 1975 Pan American Games
Athletes (track and field) at the 1978 Commonwealth Games
Commonwealth Games competitors for Bermuda
Pan American Games competitors for Bermuda
Tennessee State Lady Tigers track and field athletes
Olympic female sprinters